The Afghan Threat Finance Cell was a multi-agency intelligence organization in Afghanistan.
The organization was created in 2008. The United States' Drug Enforcement Administration was the lead agency in the organization. The co-deputy agencies were the United States Treasury and the United States Department of Defense. Other participating agencies included the Royal Canadian Mounted Police, the United States Federal Bureau of Investigation, the United States Department of Homeland Security, and the United States Internal Revenue Service.

History
The Afghan Threat Finance Cell was set up at the initiative of General David Petraeus, when he was promoted to command of Central Command, based on the experience of the earlier Iraqi Threat Finance Cell that had reported to him when he was in command in Iraq.

In February 2011, Dexter Filkins, writing in The New Yorker, reported:

  The organization was instrumental in exposing corruption in the Kabul Bank, which came close to collapse in 2010.

In February 2012 the Afghan Threat Finance Cell was awarded the Department of Defense's Joint Meritorious Unit Award.

Operations

Tracking both illicit and legitimate financial transactions led to 27 approved targets to be named on the "Joint Prioritized Effects List".  The Joint Prioritized Effects List is colloquially called the "kill or capture list".  Once an individual is named on this list, special forces are authorized to covertly target and raid that individual's home or workplace.

References

Controversies in Afghanistan
Corruption in Afghanistan
Crime in Afghanistan
Defunct law enforcement agencies of Afghanistan
Drug Enforcement Administration
War in Afghanistan (2001–2021)
Federal Bureau of Investigation
Internal Revenue Service
Royal Canadian Mounted Police
United States Department of Defense
United States Department of Homeland Security
United States Department of the Treasury
Banking controversies
Economy of Afghanistan
Organisations based in Kabul
Organizations established in 2008
2008 establishments in Afghanistan
2008 establishments in the United States
Defunct Afghan intelligence agencies